Selvatelle is a village in Tuscany, central Italy, administratively a frazione of the comune of Terricciola, province of Pisa. At the time of the 2001 census its population was 924.

Selvatelle is about 40 km from Pisa and 5 km from Terricciola.

References 

Frazioni of the Province of Pisa